DPV Deutscher Pressevertrieb is a full-service distributor for the worldwide distribution
of media products with its head office in Hamburg and further branches in Stuttgart,
Mörfelden-Walldorf, Hürth and Munich.

Company profile
DPV Deutscher Pressevertrieb, a complete subsidiary of the publishing house Gruner + Jahr, is a full-service distributor for the worldwide distribution of media products. DPV was established in 2006 as a result of a reorganisation of the complete distribution activities of Gruner + Jahr and their subsidiaries. All the distribution services for all clients are consolidated in this new organisation. The group accounts for a gross market turnover at cover prices of approx. 1.1 billion Euro. More than 500 employees at five branches in Germany are managing more than 5 million subscriptions. DPV takes care of the complete range of services for its clients such as distribution control, direct and retail marketing for print and digital media products, logistics as well as import and export of the media brands in question.

Clients and products (selection)

Subsidiaries
Besides the five units of the DPV following companies belong to the group:
 BPV Berliner Pressevertrieb GmbH & Co. KG
 IP Internationale Presse GmbH & Co KG
 MSP Medien-Service und Promotion GmbH
 W.E. Saarbach GmbH
 DPV Network Rhein-Main (SI Special Interest GmbH & Co KG)
 interabo GmbH

Commitment
DPV Academy, Futurum Distribution Reward

Commitment in different organisations and associations:
 Verband Deutscher Zeitschriftenverleger (VDZ)
 Arbeitskreis Mittelständischer Verlage (AMV)
 Distripress
 Deutscher Dialogmarketing Verband (DDV)
 Awardee kress awards 2010
 Awardee futurum Vertriebspreis 2010

Literature
 Peter Brummund: Struktur und Organisation des Pressevertriebs: Absatzformen, Absatzhelfer und Absatzwege in der Vertriebsorganisation der Zeitungs- und Zeitschriften-Verlage. Saur, Dortmund 2006,

External links 
 DPV Deutscher Pressevertrieb GmbH

Companies based in Hamburg
Mass media in Hamburg